Jan Fjetland (born 12 August 1962) is a Norwegian former footballer who played as a forward. He spent most of his career at Vidar, with the exception of 1989 when he played for Viking and won the Norwegian Cup. He is the twin brother of Egil Fjetland.

Club career
Fjetland started his career in his hometown-club Vidar. He played 500 matches and scored 289 goals for the club during the 1980s, when Vidar was competing for promotion to the top league, and the beginning of the 1990s until he retired in 1994. Fjetland is the most-scoring player on Vidar and the player with second-most appearances for the club, and is one of the best players that have played for Vidar.

Fjetland moved to Viking with his twinbrother, Egil Fjetland ahead of the 1989-season. While Egil played for Viking for four seasons, Jan only stayed at the club for one year. He played eight matches and scored one goal in the league while scoring two goals in four matches in the cup. Fjetland was nicknamed "Postmannen" during his time at Viking, because he was working as a postman in addition to playing football.

Fjetland stated before he joined Viking, that he joined the club to win the Norwegian Cup final, and he delivered his best performance for Viking in the rematch of the 1989 Norwegian Cup final. Fjetland scored the first goal when Molde was beaten 2–1, and together with Alf Kåre Tveit he was Viking's best player in the match. That match was also the last time Fjetland played alongside his brother for Viking, and it took 22 years before another pair of brothers (Valon and Veton Berisha) started a match together for Viking.

International career
Fjetland scored in his international debut at youth level, in Norway U16's match against Sweden U16 on 29 September 1979. The next year he played five matches for the Under-19 team, in which he scored two goals.

References

1962 births
Living people
Sportspeople from Stavanger
Norwegian footballers
Viking FK players
Eliteserien players
Association football forwards